Fatima (505/15-532 CE) was daughter of the Islamic prophet Muhammad and wife to his cousin Ali, the fourth of the Rashidun caliphs and the first Shia Imam. Fatima has been compared to Mary, mother of Jesus, especially in Shia Islam. Muhammad is said to have regarded her as the best of women and the dearest person to him. She is often viewed as an ultimate archetype for Muslim women and an example of compassion, generosity, and enduring suffering. It is through Fatima that Muhammad's family line has survived to this date. Her name and her epithets remain popular choices for Muslim girls.

Names and titles 
Her most common epithet is al-Zahra, which encodes her piety and regularity in prayer. This epithet is believed by the Shia to be a reference to her primordial creation from light that continues to radiate throughout the creation. The Shia Ibn Babawahy writes that, whenever Fatima prayed, her light shone for the inhabitants of the heavens as starlight shines for the inhabitants of the earth. Other titles of her in Shia are al-Ṣiddiqa, al-Tahira, al-Mubaraka, and al-Mansura. Another Shia title is al-Muḥadditha, in view of the reports that angels spoke to Fatima on multiple occasions, similar to Mary, mother of Jesus.

Fatima is also recognized as Sayyidat Nisa' al-Janna and Sayyidat Nisa' al-Alamin in Shia and Sunni collections of hadith, including the canonical Sunni Sahih al-Bukhari and Sahih Muslim.

Fatima 
The name Fatima is from the Arabic root f-t-m and signifies the Shia belief that she, her progeny, and her adherents have been spared from hellfire. Alternatively, the word Fatima is associated in Shia sources with Fatir (a name of God) as the earthly symbol of the divine creative power.

s 
A  or honorific title of Fatima in Islam is Umm Abiha, suggesting that Fatima was exceptionally nurturing towards her father.

See also
 Fatimiyya
 Burial of Fatima
 Names and titles of Muhammad

References

Sources

External links
 Fatima Zahra

Fatimah
Religious honorifics
Fatimah